Morula whiteheadae is a species of sea snail, a marine gastropod mollusk in the family Muricidae, the murex snails or rock snails. The species was named in honour of Thora Whitehead.

Description

Distribution

References

 Houart R. 2004. Review of Recent species of Morula (Oppomorus), M. (Azumamorula), and M. (Habromorula) (Gastropoda: Muricidae: Ergalataxinae). Novapex 5(4): 91–130.

whiteheadae
Gastropods described in 2004